Fatma Kaplan Hürriyet (born 20 March 1982) is a Turkish lawyer and politician from the Republican People's Party (CHP) who served as the Member of Parliament for Kocaeli from June 2015 till her election as Mayor of İzmit in the 2019 local elections.

In January 2017, Fatma Kaplan Hürriyet was allegedly strangled by AKP Parliamentary Group Leader Mustafa Elitaş after she filmed Elitaş and Prime Minister Binali Yıldırım casting open votes at parliamentary voting for constitutional amendments.

Hürriyet was one of 15 CHP deputies to join the Good Party on 21 April 2018. She rejoined the CHP less than a month later.

In the 2019 local elections, Hürriyet was elected mayor of İzmit with 50% of the vote. She was sworn in on April 15.

See also
25th Parliament of Turkey
26th Parliament of Turkey
27th Parliament of Turkey

References

External links
 Official Website
MP profile on the Grand National Assembly website

Contemporary Republican People's Party (Turkey) politicians
Good Party politicians
Deputies of Kocaeli
Members of the 25th Parliament of Turkey
Members of the 26th Parliament of Turkey
Members of the 27th Parliament of Turkey
Living people
Turkish women lawyers
People from Tekirdağ
1982 births
Kocaeli University alumni
21st-century Turkish women politicians
21st-century Turkish politicians
21st-century Turkish lawyers